Sri Ramkrishna Sikshalaya is a famous Higher Secondary School at 106, N.S. Dutta Road, Kadamtala, Howrah, West Bengal 711101 India.This school was founded by Sri Indubhusan Chattopadhyay and Sri Sadhan Kumar Bandyopadhyay on 13 December 1942.

Primary schools in West Bengal
High schools and secondary schools in West Bengal
Schools in Kolkata
Schools in Howrah district
Educational institutions established in 1942
1942 establishments in India